Bruto may refer to:

People

Given name
Bruto Brivonesi (1888–1979), Italian admiral
Bruto Buozzi (1885–1937), Italian gymnast
Bruto Castellani (1881–1933), Italian silent film actor
Bruto Testoni (1891–1949), Italian wrestler

Surname
Alfredo Bruto da Costa (1938–2016), Portuguese politician
Francisco Bruto Da Costa (born 1981), Indian footballer

Other uses
Ellroy (original Italian name Bruto Gancetto), a character in the Mickey Mouse universe
El Bruto, a 1953 Mexican drama film
Giunio Bruto, a 1781 opera seria by Domenico Cimarosa 
"Lindo Pero Bruto", a Latin pop song

See also
Brutos Framework, an MVC controller for user interfaces
The Good, the Bad and the Ugly (original Italian name Il buono, il brutto, il cattivo), an Italian western film
Brutto (disambiguation)